La vita veramente is the debut studio album by Italian singer-songwriter Fulminacci.

The album was released on 9 April 2019 and includes the singles "Borghese in borghese", "La vita veramente" and "Una sera". On 6 December 2019, a vinyl version of the album was released, featuring the singles "Le ruote, i motori!" and "San Giovanni".

La vita veramente was awarded with the Targa Tenco for Best 2019 Debut Album.

Track listing

Charts

Awards and nominations

References

2019 albums
Fulminacci albums